William Custis  (1633 – 1698) was a North American Colonial British merchant, planter and politician, and one of the founders of the Custis Family of Virginia, one of the First Families of Virginia.

The Netherlands-born younger brother of merchant John Custis II was naturalized with his brother in 1658. Their father, Henry Custis, had emigrated to Rotterdam in the Netherlands from Gloucester County in England to escape the English Civil Wars, and operated a tavern catering to fellow emigrants, as well as engaged in commerce. His elder sister Ann married Argoll Yeardley, the son of Sir George Yeardley, who twice served as Governor of the Virginia Colony, where Sir George died in 1627. In 1649 or 1650, John Custis II traveled to Jamestown with his sister and her husband, and William Custis also emigrated to the colony. Argoll Yeardley would serve in the House of Burgesses in 1653, two years before his death.

William Custis married three times. By his first wife (whose name did not survive), he had a son, named after his father and who carried on the family name, but his wife died, as did their younger son John Custis. William Custis remarried, to Joan Hall in Northampton County. She died before 1692 in what had become Accomack County (likewise in Virginia's Eastern Shore), after giving with to three sons (none of whom survived to adulthood) and a daughter, Joanna Mary Custis. William Custis remarried, and was survived by his widow, Bridget Custis, whose daughter Bridget Custis died before 1727. 

In 1656 William Custis was suspected of complicity in the murder of Paul Rynmers, but when nothing happened after he followed orders to touch the corpse, Custis was released. In the 1660s, Custis bought 1200 acres of land for a farm; also in that decade a man who killed some of Custis's marked cattle was prosecuted and fined a thousand pounds of tobacco. Custis also filed indentures for several native American boys, as did fellow large landowners. In 1670 William Custis became one of the four justices of the new Accomack County Court, together with Thomas Rydings, Daniel Jenifer and Thomas Brown, who thereby joined Southey Littleton, Charles Scarburgh, Edmund Bowman and John Wise who administered the county as well as handled trials. In 1677, Accomack County voters elected William Custis as one of their representatives in the House of Burgesses about a decade after the county on Virginia's Eastern Shore was split and Northumberland County created. During that term, that his brother represented Northumberland County.

References

1633 births
1698 deaths
American planters
House of Burgesses members
British North American Anglicans
Custis family of Virginia
People from Accomack County, Virginia